Mitromorpha azorensis is a species of sea snail, a marine gastropod mollusk in the family Mitromorphidae.

Description

Distribution
This marine species occurs off the Azores.

References

 Mifsud, C., 2001 The genus Mitromorpha Carpenter, 1865 and its subgenera with European species, p. 32 pp

External links
 MNHN, Paris: Mitromorpha azorensis (holotype)
 

azorensis
Gastropods described in 2001